This is a list of records published by the Rak Records Label

Singles

Albums

Sources 
 RAK - Label Discography, 45cat

Rak Records
Rak Records